Slavin is a surname and sometimes a given name.

People with the surname
 Andrei Nickolay Slavin, American engineer
 Barbara Slavin (born 1951), American journalist and foreign policy expert
 Hugh Slavin (1882–1947), English footballer
 Jaccob Slavin (born 1994), American professional ice hockey player 
 Jane Slavin (born 1970), a British actress and author
 John Slavin, a Scottish footballer
 Jonathan Slavin, an American actor
 Julia Slavin, an American short story writer and novelist
 Mark Slavin (1954–1972), an Israeli Olympic wrestler and victim of the Munich massacre
 Martin Slavin (1922–1988), a British composer and music director
 Morris Slavin (1913–2006), American historian and Trotskyist activist
 Neal Slavin, an American photographer and film director
 Patrick Slavin (1877–1916), Scottish footballer
 Richard Slavin, birth name of Radhanath Swami
 Robert Slavin, an American psychologist
 Shimon Slavin, an Israeli professor of medicine

People with the given name
 Slavin Cindrić (1901–1942), a Croatian footballer